Rose Mary may refer to:

 USS Rose Mary (SP-1216), a United States Navy patrol vessel

See also
 Rosemary (disambiguation)
 Rose Marie (disambiguation)